Theodor Maurer (1 January 1889 Halinga Parish (now Põhja-Pärnumaa Parish), Kreis Pernau – ?) was an Estonian politician. He was a member of the III Riigikogu, representing the Estonian Workers' Party. He was a member of the Riigikogu since 7 July 1926. He replaced Paul Abramson.

References

1889 births
Year of death missing
People from Põhja-Pärnumaa Parish
People from Kreis Pernau
Estonian Workers' Party politicians
Members of the Riigikogu, 1926–1929